Jearl Atawa Miles Clark (née Miles; born September 4, 1966 in Gainesville, Florida) is an American athlete who competed mainly in the 400 and 800 meters.

She held the American record in the women's 800 m at 1:56.40.

She competed for the United States in the 1992 Summer Olympics held in Barcelona, Spain in the 4 x 400 meters where she won the silver medal with her teammates Natasha Kaiser, Gwen Torrence and Rochelle Stevens.

She returned to the 1996 Summer Olympics in Atlanta, U.S. where she again ran with Rochelle Stevens and fellow Americans Maicel Malone and Kim Graham to win the gold medal in the 4 x 400 meters.

She made a third appearance in the Olympics in the 2000 Summer Olympics held in Sydney, Australia and again walked off with the gold medal in the 4 x 400 metres with her teammates Monique Hennagan, Marion Jones and LaTasha Colander-Richardson. This medal was later stripped due to steroid doping admissions of Marion Jones.  However, she and 6 other members of the team would successfully appeal the decision to strip them of their medals in July 2010.

She is married to J. J. Clark, brother of Olympians Joetta Clark and Hazel Clark. Her father-in-law is Joe Louis Clark.

She was a volunteer track and field coach at the University of Connecticut, where her husband worked as head coach for track and field. She was inducted into the National Track and Field Hall of Fame in 2010.

Miles-Clark is a 1989 graduate of Alabama A&M University.

She currently resides with her husband, J.J. and their son, Jorell in California.

References

External links
 
 
 
 
 
 

1966 births
Sportspeople from Gainesville, Florida
Track and field athletes from Florida
American female sprinters
Olympic gold medalists for the United States in track and field
Olympic silver medalists for the United States in track and field
Athletes (track and field) at the 1991 Pan American Games
Athletes (track and field) at the 1992 Summer Olympics
Athletes (track and field) at the 1996 Summer Olympics
Athletes (track and field) at the 2000 Summer Olympics
Athletes (track and field) at the 2004 Summer Olympics
Living people
World Athletics Championships medalists
American masters athletes
World record holders in masters athletics
Medalists at the 2000 Summer Olympics
Medalists at the 1996 Summer Olympics
Medalists at the 1992 Summer Olympics
Pan American Games medalists in athletics (track and field)
Pan American Games gold medalists for the United States
Pan American Games bronze medalists for the United States
Universiade medalists in athletics (track and field)
Goodwill Games medalists in athletics
Universiade gold medalists for the United States
World Athletics Indoor Championships winners
World Athletics Indoor Championships medalists
World Athletics Championships winners
Competitors at the 1998 Goodwill Games
Competitors at the 2001 Goodwill Games
Competitors at the 1994 Goodwill Games
Medalists at the 1991 Pan American Games
Goodwill Games gold medalists in athletics
Olympic female sprinters
21st-century American women